Oonche Log may refer to:

 Oonche Log (1965 film)
 Oonche Log (1985 film)